Eodorcadion novitzkyi is a species of beetle in the family Cerambycidae. It was described by Suvorov in 1909. It is known from Mongolia.

References

Dorcadiini
Beetles described in 1909